Gloeopeniophorella is a genus of crust-like, wood-decaying fungi in the family Russulaceae. It contains six known species. Gloeopeniophorella was first described by Brazilian mycologist Johannes Rick in 1934.

Hjortstam & Ryvarden (2007) wrote on Gloeopeniophorella: "The genus should be fairly easy to recognize with species having an almost smooth hymenophore, hyphae without clamp-connections, both metuloids and gloeocystidia, and spores that are both rugose and amyloid. We are of the opinion that the dextrinoid reaction of the metuloids in Dextrinocystidium is not an important character for generic separation."

References

Russulales
Russulales genera
Taxa named by Johannes Rick
Taxa described in 1934